Hồ Trung Dung  (born 1925) was a Vietnamese prominent French medical doctor in Vietnam for over 50 years from the 1950s until his retirement at the end of the 20th century.

Education

He completed the French Baccalauraete; He graduated from the French established Medical School in Saigon – Saigon Medical School Ho Chi Minh City Medicine and Pharmacy University

Family
Hồ's father-in-law was Minister of Health – Dr.Khuong Huu Long under the last monarch Bảo Đại. Hồ is a direct descendant of an aristocrat from city Vĩnh Long, Vietnam.  Hồ's wife was Mrs. Khương Hữu Thị Hiệp.  from a wealthy and well-established family Khương Hữu. He retired in the United States after the fall of Saigon in 1975 and died in 2002.

Medical practice 

Hồ served as chief executive officer and president of Từ Dũ, an OB/GYN hospital in Saigon since the 1950s until the fall of Saigon in 1975. During this period he also taught medicine at Saigon Medical School and served as its vice-chancellor and Dean of Academy. He presided, judged, graded, and appointed hundreds/thousands of newly graduated medical doctors in Vietnam. Many Vietnamese-refugee-medical doctors' diplomas  (these doctors immigrated to Europe and the US since the fall of Saigon in 1975, have been successfully practicing medicine) have Hồ's signature as "stamp of approval".

Life in retirement

Hồ remained a private citizen and practiced medicine in the United States from 1975 and died in 2002 at the age of 85. His wife died in 2013. They have seven children; 2 have died and 5 reside in the US.

References

External links
Từ Dũ Hospital - Saigon, Vietnam  
Bộ Giáo Dục - Hà Nội 

1925 births
2002 deaths
Vietnamese people of the Vietnam War
Vietnamese Buddhists
Vietnamese obstetricians and gynaecologists
20th-century Vietnamese physicians
Vietnamese emigrants to the United States